Ceionia Fabia (flourished 2nd century) was a noble Roman woman and a member of the ruling Nerva–Antonine dynasty of the Roman Empire.

Life
Fabia was the first-born daughter to Lucius Aelius and Avidia. In 136, her father was adopted by Hadrian as heir to the throne. Fabia had three siblings: a sister Ceionia Plautia and two brothers: the Roman Emperor Lucius Verus who co-ruled with Marcus Aurelius from 161 to 169 and Gaius Avidius Ceionius Commodus. Her cognomen Fabia reveals that her father was related to the gens Fabia. However, whom she was named after from the gens Fabia is unknown. Fabia was born and raised in Rome.

Her maternal grandparents were the Roman Senator Gaius Avidius Nigrinus and the surmised but undocumented noblewoman Plautia. Although her adoptive paternal grandparents were the Roman Emperor Hadrian and Roman Empress Vibia Sabina, her biological paternal grandparents were the consul Lucius Ceionius Commodus and noblewoman named Plautia.

Sometime in 136 after Hadrian announced that her father was to be the Emperor's official heir, on the wishes of Hadrian, the emperor betrothed Fabia to Hadrian's great-nephew Marcus Aurelius. Although Fabia and Aurelius became engaged, the engagement did not survive Hadrian; immediately after the emperor's death, Antoninus Pius, Hadrian's second adopted son and the new emperor, approached Marcus and requested that his marriage arrangements be amended: Marcus' betrothal to Ceionia Fabia would be annulled, and he would be betrothed to Faustina, Antoninus' daughter, instead. Faustina's betrothal to Ceionia's brother Lucius Commodus would also have to be annulled. Marcus consented to Antoninus' proposal.

Fabia later married the nobleman Plautius Quintillus who came from a family of consular rank. During the reign of Antoninus Pius (138-161), Quintillus served as an ordinary consul in 159. Fabia bore Quintillus a son called Marcus Peducaeus Plautius Quintillus who later married Annia Aurelia Fadilla, one of the daughters of Marcus Aurelius and Faustina the Younger.

Throughout the Roman Empire, various honorific inscriptions have survived being dedicated to Fabia and her family. These inscriptions honor Fabia as the mother of Marcus Peducaeus Plautius Quintillus; the sister of Roman Emperor Lucius Verus and the sister-in-law of Empress Lucilla (the second daughter of Marcus Aurelius and Faustina the Younger, who was one of the sisters of Fadilla). According to an inscription found at Ephesus, Fabia was present when Lucius Verus married Lucilla.

It appears by 175 her husband had died. When Faustina the Younger had died in 175, Fabia was said to have attempted to interest Marcus Aurelius in a second marriage. However, Marcus Aurelius preferred to take a mistress, who was a daughter of one of Faustina's procurators.

Notes

Sources
 From Tiberius to the Antonines: a history of the Roman Empire AD 14–192, by Albino Garzetti, 1974
 Cassio Dione e l'impero romano da Nerva ad Antonino Pio: alla luce dei nuovi by Guido Migliorati, 2003 – Italian Historical Secondary Source
 The Cambridge ancient history, Volume 11 By Alan K. Bowman, Peter Garnsey, Dominic Rathbone Limited preview - Edition: 2 - Item notes: v. 11 – 2000
 Marcus Aurelius, by Anthony Richard Birley, Routledge, 2000
 http://www.roman-emperors.org/lverus.htm
 https://web.archive.org/web/20130525075850/http://www.roman-empire.net/highpoint/marcaurelius.html

Nerva–Antonine dynasty
Fabia
2nd-century Roman women